is a Japanese talk show aired every Sunday on Asahi TV. The show is hosted by Bunshi Katsura VI and has run since January 1971. The show involves newlywed couples being interviewed by Katsura and a co-host. The current co-hostess is Mami Yamase.

A Vietnamese version of the program, Vợ Chồng Son, has been airing on Ho Chi Minh City Television since 2013, making it the first Asahi Broadcasting Television program to have an international version.

Guinness World Record
In July 2015, the show was awarded a Guinness World Record as the longest-running talk show to be hosted by the same person.

References

1971 Japanese television series debuts
Asahi Broadcasting Corporation original programming
Japanese variety television shows